Assassination of the Duke of Guise may refer to:

 Assassination of the Duke of Guise (1563)
 Assassination of the Duke of Guise (1588)